Your Choice Live Series Vol. 03 is an album by Life... But How To Live It?, which was released in 1989 through Your Choice Records. Recorded live October 28, 1989 at Oberhaus in Alzey, Germany (together with Verbal Assault).

The police tried to stop the show, but the band continued playing and the audience kicked out the police. All this is documented on the live album.

The band also performed the songs "Passing Through" and Smash It Up (by The Damned) which were left off this album and appear on the It's Your Choice compilation.

Track listing
 "Beautiful World"
 "The Return of the Coneheads"
 "Life, and How to Live It..."
 "Retouched Exitement"
 "Strength"
 "So Sorry"
 "Christmastime"
 "Happy"
 "Holes"
 "For My Lover" (by Tracy Chapman)

Personnel
Life... But How To Live It?:
Katja Benneche Osvold - vocals
Roger Andreassen - Guitars, vocals
Tom Andreassen - Bass, vocals
Geir Petter "Dyret" Jenssen - Drums, vocals
Tobby Holzinger - Producer

External links
Official band profile on MySpace
Your Choice Records, official site

1989 live albums
Life... But How to Live It? albums

de:Life… But How To Live It?
no:Life… But How To Live It?